Nedeljko Jurić (born 18 July 1978) is a Bosnian retired football player.

Club career
Jurić joined second tier Drinovci from top-level side Zrinjski in 2003. He left Bosnia and Herzegovina in 2013 to play for Austrian amateur side USV Eichgraben.

International career
He made two appearances for Bosnia and Herzegovina at the August 2001 LG Cup, an unofficial match against South Africa and an official international match against Iran.

References

External links

Profile - NFSBIH

1978 births
Living people
Association football midfielders
Bosnia and Herzegovina footballers
Bosnia and Herzegovina international footballers
HŠK Zrinjski Mostar players
NK GOŠK Gabela players
NK Bosna Visoko players
Premier League of Bosnia and Herzegovina players
First League of the Federation of Bosnia and Herzegovina players
Bosnia and Herzegovina expatriate footballers
Expatriate footballers in Austria
Bosnia and Herzegovina expatriate sportspeople in Austria